Hope Harbour is an inlet at the north-west of West Falkland in the Falkland Islands of the South Atlantic Ocean.  About 4 km long and 1.3 km wide, it is sheltered by the promontory of Grave Cove Camp in the south, a narrow ridge terminating in Hope Point to the north, Bramble Point Camp to the east, and West Point Island at its entrance to the west.  Carcass Island lies 8 km north-east of Hope Point.

Important Bird Area
The inlet and its surrounds have been identified by BirdLife International as an Important Bird Area (IBA).  Birds for which the site is of conservation significance include Falkland steamer ducks, ruddy-headed geese, gentoo penguins (5750 breeding pairs), southern rockhopper penguins (242 pairs), Magellanic penguins, black-browed albatrosses (226 pairs), and white-bridled finches.  Upland geese and long-tailed meadowlarks have been recorded.  The area has been overgrazed in the past, with little remaining tussac cover, and suffers from soil erosion.  The albatrosses nest on the cliffs; the main threat to their nesting sites is landslips from cliff erosion.

References

Bays of West Falkland
Important Bird Areas of the Falkland Islands
Seabird colonies
Penguin colonies